The 2017 Open BNP Paribas Banque de Bretagne was a professional tennis tournament played on hard courts. It was the seventh edition of the tournament which was part of the 2017 ATP Challenger Tour. It took place in Quimper, France between 30 January and 5 February 2017.

Singles main-draw entrants

Seeds

1 Rankings as of January 16, 2017.

Other entrants
The following players received wildcards into the singles main draw:
  Geoffrey Blancaneaux
  Evan Furness
  Maxime Hamou
  Jerzy Janowicz

The following player received entry into the singles main draw using a protected ranking:
  Jürgen Melzer

The following players received entry from the qualifying draw:
  Calvin Hemery
  Aslan Karatsev
  Hugo Nys
  Gleb Sakharov

The following player received entry as a lucky loser:
  Grégoire Jacq

Champions

Singles

 Adrian Mannarino def.  Peter Gojowczyk 6–4, 6–4.

Doubles

 Mikhail Elgin /  Igor Zelenay def.  Ken Skupski /  Neal Skupski 2–6, 7–5, [10–5].

External links
Official Website

Open BNP Paribas Banque de Bretagne
Open BNP Paribas Banque de Bretagne
Open BNP Paribas